Bushman poison can refer to a number of plants or insects used as ingredients by the San people when preparing arrow poisons:

 Toxicodendron species of the Western Cape province
 Bushman's poison, Acokanthera spectabilis
 Bushman's poison, Acokanthera oblongifolia
 Bushman's poison, Acokanthera oppositifolia
 Bushman's poison, Acokanthera venenata, of the south and east coasts of South Africa
Also see genus Acokanthera
Succulents:
The Gifboom Euphorbias:
 Euphorbia avesmantana
 Euphorbia virosa
The Pylgif or Bushman poison: 
 Adenium boehmianum
Insects:
 A beetle genus, Diamphidia